The 2016 Women's Softball World Championship was an international softball competition to be held in Surrey, British Columbia between July 15 and July 24, 2016. It was the 15th edition of the tournament, and the second edition to be sanctioned by the World Baseball Softball Confederation (WBSC). Previous editions were sanctioned by the International Softball Federation, which governed the sport until its 2013 merger with the International Baseball Federation to create the WBSC.  It was announced on March 17, 2016, that the field for the tournament would be expanded from 16 to 31.

Qualification

Group stage

Group A

Group B

Group C

Group D

Group E

Group F

Group G

Group H

Championship round

Standings

Group 1

Group 2

Group 3

Group 4

Day 1

Day 2

Day 3

Day 4

Placement round

Standings

Group 1

Group 2

Group 3

Group 4

Day 1

Day 2

Day 3

Day 4

Championship Round-Double Page

Day 1

Day 2

Medal Round

Championship Round-Single Page

Placement Round-Double Page

First round

Quarterfinals

Final four

Placement Round-Single Page

Final standings

References

External links
 Official Page

ISF Women's World Championship
Women's Softball World Championship
2016 in Canadian women's sports
International softball competitions hosted by Canada
Sports competitions in British Columbia
2016 in British Columbia
Softball World Championship
July 2016 sports events in Canada